EURASHE (European Association of Institutions in Higher Education) is a members' based organisation gathering universities of applied sciences, university colleges, as well as national and sectorial associations and other higher education institutions that offer programmes with a strong involvement of the world of work and conduct applied research within the Bologna cycles.

The association was founded in Patras, Greece in 1990. It has the status of a non-profit international association under Belgian law.

It is a consultative member of the Bologna Process, a member of the Bologna Follow-up Group and of its Board. It also cooperates with other representative organisations involved in European higher education such as the European Association for Quality Assurance in Higher Education, European University Association, and European Students' Union.

See also
 European Association for Quality Assurance in Higher Education
 European Students' Union
 European University Association
National Institutes of Technology – 31 leading public engineering universities in India

References

External links
 Official website

Higher education organisations based in Europe
International organisations based in Belgium